Ron Kershaw (August 19, 1943 – July 3, 1988) was an American television news reporter.
Kershaw was the news director in several U.S. markets, including New York City, Chicago and Baltimore.

Early life
Kershaw grew up in Hendersonville, North Carolina and later moved to Arizona where he attended Glendale Community College. From 1961 to 1969 he served in the United States Air Force.

News director
In 1974, Kershaw was hired by WBAL-TV in Baltimore to shore up its sagging news ratings.  He introduced the Action News format, hired new talent, such as Mike Hambrick And Ron Smith and moved the station from last to first in less than a year. Sue Simmons and Spencer Christian were also among Kershaw's protégés.

In 1979, Kershaw moved on to WNBC-TV in New York, where he collaborated with Peter Sang in bringing the "control room" set into TV news, taking the station from last in the ratings to a market leader in two years. Kershaw was also mentor to Bucky Gunts, who worked for Kershaw in Baltimore and Chicago. In 1982, Kershaw NBC promoted Kershaw to be the program producer of NBC Sports.

In 1986, Kershaw was hired by the CBS affiliate in Chicago, WBBM-TV, which had recently dropped in the ratings. Kershaw reorganized the news staff and programs, bringing the station back to the top of the ratings. During his tenure the WBBM news team won five Emmys in 1987 and four in 1988 from the Chicago Chapter of the National Academy of Television Arts and Sciences.

Personal life and death
While in Houston, Kershaw had been dating Jessica Savitch, a news reporter with a rival television station in Texas. Kershaw helped Savitch develop her reporting skills during their stormy ten-year relationship. The relationship was depicted in the made-for-television movie: Almost Golden, about Savitch's life.

In 1987, Kershaw met Giselle Fernandez, whom he had hired as a reporter at WBBM-TV. They were engaged to be married when Kershaw died of pancreatic and liver cancer on July 3, 1988 at age 44.

References

American television journalists
1945 births
1989 deaths
Deaths from cancer
American male journalists